Minuscule 248 (in the Gregory-Aland numbering), ε 395 (Soden), is a Greek minuscule manuscript of the New Testament, on parchment. It has been dated by a colophon to the year 1275. It has marginalia.

Description 

The codex contains a complete text of the four Gospels on 261 parchment leaves (size ). The text is written in one column per page, 26 lines per page.

The Synaxarion was added by a later hand.

Text 

The Greek text of the codex is a representative of the Byzantine text-type. Aland placed it in Category V. It is close to the codex 71.
According to the Claremont Profile Method it has a mixture of the Byzantine text-families in Luke 1 and Luke 10. In Luke 20 it represents cluster M27.

History 

The manuscript was written by Meletius a Beroean for Cyrus Alypius, οικονομος of St. George's monastery. in the reign of Michael Palaeologus (1259-1282).

Formerly the manuscript was held at the Philotheus monastery at Athos peninsula. It was brought to Moscow, by the monk Arsenius, on the suggestion of the Patriarch Nikon, in the reign of Alexei Mikhailovich Romanov (1645-1676). The manuscript was collated by C. F. Matthaei.

The manuscript is currently housed at the State Historical Museum (V. 18, S. 277) at Moscow.

See also 

 List of New Testament minuscules
 Biblical manuscript
 Textual criticism

References

Further reading 

 C. F. Matthaei, Novum Testamentum Graece et Latine, (Riga, 1782-1788). (as r)
 Kurt Treu, Die Griechischen Handschriften des Neuen Testaments in der UdSSR; eine systematische Auswertung des Texthandschriften in Leningrad, Moskau, Kiev, Odessa, Tbilisi und Erevan, T & U 90 (Berlin, 1966), pp. 246–249.

Greek New Testament minuscules
13th-century biblical manuscripts